Chenaran is a city in Razavi Khorasan Province, Iran.

Chenaran may also refer to:

Chenaran, Ardabil, a village in Ardabil Province, Iran
Chenaran, Fars, a village in Fars Province, Iran
Chenaran, Golestan, a village in Golestan Province, Iran
Chenaran, Hamadan, a village in Hamadan Province, Iran
Chenaran, Kahnuj, a village in Kerman Province, Iran
Chenaran, Kangavar, a village in Kermanshah Province, Iran
Chenaran, Ravansar, a village in Kermanshah Province, Iran
Chenaran, Kurdistan, a village in Kurdistan Province, Iran
Chenaran, Lorestan, a village in Lorestan Province, Iran
Chenaran, Nishapur, a village in Razavi Khorasan Province, Iran
Chenaran, North Khorasan, a village in North Khorasan Province, Iran
Chenaran, South Khorasan, a village in South Khorasan Province, Iran
Chenaran, Tehran, a village in Tehran Province, Iran
Chenaran County, an administrative subdivision of Iran
Chenaran Rural District, an administrative subdivision of Iran